Frontier Agriculture Ltd is the UK’s largest crop production and grain marketing business, jointly owned by Associated British Foods and Cargill plc.

Frontier has a market share of 20% of the grain market, trades around 5 million tonnes of grain per annum and has an annual turnover in excess of £1.5 bn. The Frontier seed business supplies 65,000 tonnes of seed to UK farmers. Frontier has 46 sites across the UK and employs more than 1,100 colleagues. 140 agronomists, managing 750,000 hectares of land, and supported by a national trials programme that consists of over 12,000 replicated plots. Frontier is the largest UK distributor of fertiliser.

Frontier’s main offices are in Perth, Berwick-upon-Tweed, Cranswick, Witham St Hughs, Diss, Sandy, Hermitage and Ross-on-Wye.

Frontier belongs to the Trade Assurance Scheme for Combinable Crops, run by the Agricultural Industries Confederation.

History
Allied Grain (owned byAssociated British Foods) and Banks Cargill Agriculture merged in April 2005 under the direction of David Irwin (MD Allied Grain) to form Frontier Agriculture. Allied Grain was based in Norfolk. Banks Cargill Agriculture had been formed in February 2001 between Cargill and Sidney C Banks, a UK grain trader based in Sandy.

In 2014, Frontier Agriculture acquired GH2, the parent company of Grain Harvesters. Kent based Grain Harvesters was established in 1947, and has built up a customer base across south east England. 

In October 2021, work began to build the largest, oat-processing facility in Europe - a joint venture between Frontier, Camgrain; a farmer-owned cooperative and Anglia Maltings Holdings (AMH), a food and drink ingredient manufacturer. The site of the new mill, alongside Camgrain’s Advanced Processing Centre in a key arable region between Corby and Kettering in Northamptonshire.

References

External links
 Frontier Agriculture
 Kings Game Cover and Conservation Crops
 SOYL
 Nomix Enviro
 HGCA
 Cargill in the UK
Anglia Grain Services

North Kesteven District
Companies based in Lincolnshire
Agriculture companies of the United Kingdom
Agriculture companies established in 2005
Associated British Foods
Cargill
British companies established in 2005